Justice Cook or Cooke may refer to:

Arthur Cooke, associate justice of the Supreme Court of Pennsylvania
Charles A. Cooke, associate justice of the North Carolina Supreme Court
Deborah L. Cook, associate justice of the Ohio Supreme Court
Eugene A. Cook, associate justice of the Texas Supreme Court
George A. Cooke, associate justice and chief justice of the Supreme Court of Illinois
Eugene Cook (Georgia judge), associate justice of the Supreme Court of Georgia
James Burch Cooke, associate justice of the Tennessee Supreme Court
John Dillard Cook, associate justice of the Supreme Court of Missouri
Joseph P. Cook, associate justice of the Connecticut Supreme Court
Lawrence H. Cooke, chief judge of the New York Court of Appeals
Ralph Cook (born 1944), associate justice of the Alabama Supreme Court
Sam C. Cook (1855–1924), associate justice of the Supreme Court of Mississippi 
Walter Cooke (Rhode Island judge), associate justice of the Rhode Island Supreme Court
William Henry Cook (1874–1937), associate justice of the Supreme Court of Mississippi
William Loch Cook, associate justice of the Tennessee Supreme Court
William Wilcox Cooke, associate justice of the Tennessee Supreme Court

See also
Justice Coke (disambiguation)